Crete University Press is a university press co-organized and operated by the Pancretan Association of America and the Foundation for Research & Technology – Hellas (FORTH). The press is a non-profit organization supported entirely by the sale of its books. Crete University Press is a member of the International Association of University Presses.

See also

 List of university presses

References

External links 
Crete University Press

1984 establishments in Greece